Hypectopa ornithograpta is a moth of the family Gracillariidae. It is known from Papua New Guinea.

References

Acrocercopinae
Moths described in 1955